Hottentotta caboverdensis is a species of scorpions of the family Buthidae. The species was described by Wilson R. Lourenço and Eric Ythier in 2006. The specific name caboverdensis refers to Cape Verde, where the new species was found.

Description

The females reach 62 mm length. The colour is reddish-brown to dark brown.

Distribution
The species is endemic to Cape Verde, where it occurs on the island of Santiago.  It is considered the only native species of scorpions in the archipelago.

References

Buthidae
Scorpions of Africa
Arthropods of Cape Verde
Endemic fauna of Cape Verde
Fauna of Santiago, Cape Verde
Animals described in 2006
Taxa named by Wilson R. Lourenço
Taxa named by Éric Ythier